Calce is a commune in the Pyrénées-Orientales department in southern France.

Geography

Localisation 
Calce is located in the canton of Le Ribéral and in the arrondissement of Perpignan.

Government and politics

Mayors

Population

See also
Communes of the Pyrénées-Orientales department
Center for Advanced Life Cycle Engineering

References

Communes of Pyrénées-Orientales